Júlio Delamare Aquatics Centre is located in the Maracanã neighbourhood of Rio de Janeiro, Brazil. It is one of the main swimming facilities in Rio and opened in 1978. It was named after the sports journalist Júlio Delamare, a supporter of its creation, who died five years before its inauguration. He died on the Varig Flight 820, in France. The plane caught on fire, causing it to crash.

See also 
 Maria Lenk Aquatic Center
 Swimming Olympic Centre of Bahia

Sports venues in Rio de Janeiro (city)
Swimming venues in Brazil